Luis Carlos Ugalde Ramírez (born 1966 in Mexico City) is a Mexican scholar who served as president of the Federal Electoral Institute from 2003 to 2007.

Education
Luis Carlos Ugalde received a Ph.D. in Political Science (1999) and a Master's Degree in Political Science (1994) and Public Administration (1992), all from Columbia University.  He also holds a B.A. in Economics from Instituto Tecnológico Autónomo de México (ITAM) (1990).

Career
Dr. Ugalde has combined a solid career in academics and consulting with high-ranking positions within the Mexican government. Most notably, he served as president of Mexico´s Electoral Commission (Instituto Federal Electoral, IFE) from 2003-2007, presiding over the institution during the country´s bitterly contested 2006 presidential election.

Dr. Ugalde has taught at various universities in Mexico and the United States, among them the InstitutoTecnológicoAutónomo de México (ITAM), the Center for Economic Research and Teaching (CIDE), Harvard University, Georgetown University and American University. In 2011 he was a Reagan-Fascell Democracy Fellow at the National Endowment for Democracy in Washington, D.C.

In addition to his academic career, he has worked in the Mexican government. He was Chief of Staff to the Secretary of Energy in 1997 and Chief of Staff at the Embassy of Mexico to the United States of America, from 1997 to 2000. Ugalde showed political ambitions form an early stage and was linked to the long time ruling party of Mexico, the PRI, where he served as part of the ideology commission, linked to Jesus Reyes Heroles.

He was appointed president of the Federal Electoral Institute by Congress in October 2003. During the 2006 Presidential Election, Ugalde came under fire, as one of the candidates demanded a recount in the midst of a widely questioned election. The electoral authorities under Ugalde were accused of being complicit in electoral fraud. Eventually, the pressure from the political parties resulted in a legal reform that would attempt to rectify the illegalities that occurred in the 2006 elections.

The 2007 Electoral Reform included the dismissal of Luis Carlos Ugalde from his position by designing a new President of the IFE. The Congress had until December 13, 2007 to designate Luis Carlos Ugalde's successor but postponed the date of the designation of the new President of the IFE until February 2008. Ugalde, following the reforms, decided to leave the IFE on December 14, 2007; He resigned first before the General Council and then filed his resignation before the Congress.

He has authored numerous publications, including As I Lived It: A Testimony of the Most Competitive Election in the Modern History of Mexico (2008, in Spanish). He is also the author of The Mexican Congress: Old Player, New Power, a book published in 2000 by the Center for Strategic and International Studies in Washington, D.C.

In January 2008, Ugalde became the Robert F. Kennedy Visiting Professor of Latin American Studies at Harvard University. Then in 2009, Luis Carlos Ugalde joined the faculty of the Department of Political Science at ITAM imparting the courses of Compared Politics, Democracy in Latin America, and Mexican Politics. Today, Luis Carlos Ugalde is the Executive Director and founder of Integralia Consultants, a firm dedicated to research and consultancy in areas related to transparency, accountability, good governance, and political and legislative intelligence.

External links
 https://www.youtube.com/watch?v=E3-D-UJsBNQ
 https://www.youtube.com/watch?v=wLMJV3JZU7g

1966 births
Living people
Academic staff of the Instituto Tecnológico Autónomo de México
People from Mexico City
Instituto Tecnológico Autónomo de México alumni
Columbia Graduate School of Arts and Sciences alumni
Harvard University staff
Mexican people of Basque descent
Reagan-Fascell Democracy Fellows
School of International and Public Affairs, Columbia University alumni